Parambia gnomosynalis is a moth in the family Crambidae. It was described by Harrison Gray Dyar Jr. in 1914. It is found from Guatemala south through Central America to northern South America.

References

Glaphyriinae
Moths described in 1914